Balasinor is one of the 182 Legislative Assembly constituencies of Gujarat state in India. It is part of Kheda district.

List of segments
This assembly seat represents the following segments,

 Balasinor Taluka
 Virpur Taluka
 Kapadvanj Taluka (Part) Villages – Vaghana Muvada, Gocharna Muvada, Kamboya, Ghadiya, Malana Muvada, Valva Mahuda, Kavath, Kashipura, Suki, Pathoda, Vaghas, Dantali, Thavad, Sultanpur (Vadadhara), Vadadhara, Vanta, Ghauva, Sunda, Reliya, Dudhathal, Letar, Bhutiya, Danadra, Antisar, Garod, Ramosadi, Khadol, Mal Itadi Pagi Bhag, Mal Itadi Baraiya Bhag, Vejalpur, Rampura (Sorna), Savali, Chikhlod, Vadol
 Kathlal Taluka (Part) Villages – Sikandar Porda, Vishvnathpura, Charan Nikol, Fagvel, Porda Fagvel, Fulchhatrapura, Lasundra, Ladvel, Laxmanpura

Members of Legislative Assembly

Election results

2022

2017

2012

See also
 List of constituencies of Gujarat Legislative Assembly
 Gujarat Legislative Assembly

References

External links
 

Assembly constituencies of Gujarat
Kheda district